Yazalde Gomes Pinto (born 21 September 1988), known simply as Yazalde, is a Portuguese professional footballer who plays as a forward.

He achieved Primeira Liga totals of 162 games and 27 goals for six teams, mainly Rio Ave, and was contracted for several seasons by Braga, who loaned him out for most of that time. He also competed professionally in Romania and Azerbaijan.

Club career
Born in Vila do Conde, Yazalde began playing professionally with second division's Varzim SC, making two appearances late in the 2006–07 season. He went on to establish himself as an important first-team member.

On 15 December 2008, Yazalde moved to Primeira Liga club S.C. Braga, signing a five-and-a-half-year contract effective as of January of the following year. However, he would be immediately loaned until the end of the campaign to league strugglers Rio Ave FC; on 22 February, he scored the game's only goal at home against Vitória de Setúbal.

In mid-January 2010, after having appeared rarely for Braga during the season, Yazalde was loaned to fellow top-flight side S.C. Olhanense for five months. In June, he returned to Rio Ave, also on loan.

Yazalde would be consecutively loaned by Braga in the following years, to S.C. Beira-Mar, FC Astra Giurgiu and Gabala FK. On 27 June 2015 he returned to Rio Ave for a third spell, agreeing to a three-year deal.

On 13 September 2018, after a brief spell with C.F. Os Belenenses, 30-year-old Yazalde returned to the Romanian Liga I after agreeing to a one-year contract at CS Gaz Metan Mediaș. At its conclusion, he moved to FC Hermannstadt of the same league on a two-year deal.

International career
Yazalde represented Portugal at under-21 level. As his father was born in Guinea-Bissau, Luís Norton de Matos, coach of the Guinea-Bissau national team, tried to persuade him to play for the Africans as a senior, but the player aspired to appear for his country of birth.

Honours
Astra Giurgiu
Cupa României: 2013–14

References

External links

1988 births
Living people
People from Vila do Conde
Portuguese sportspeople of Bissau-Guinean descent
Sportspeople from Porto District
Portuguese footballers
Association football forwards
Primeira Liga players
Liga Portugal 2 players
Varzim S.C. players
S.C. Braga players
Rio Ave F.C. players
S.C. Olhanense players
S.C. Braga B players
S.C. Beira-Mar players
Gil Vicente F.C. players
C.F. Os Belenenses players
Liga I players
Liga II players
FC Astra Giurgiu players
CS Gaz Metan Mediaș players
FC Hermannstadt players
CSC 1599 Șelimbăr players
Azerbaijan Premier League players
Gabala FC players
Najran SC players
Portugal youth international footballers
Portugal under-21 international footballers
Portuguese expatriate footballers
Expatriate footballers in Romania
Expatriate footballers in Azerbaijan
Expatriate footballers in Saudi Arabia
Portuguese expatriate sportspeople in Romania
Portuguese expatriate sportspeople in Azerbaijan
Portuguese expatriate sportspeople in Saudi Arabia